The  is a double reed Japanese  used as one of two main melodic instruments in Japanese  music. It is one of the "sacred" instruments and is often heard at Shinto weddings in Japan. Its sound is often described as haunting.

According to scholars, the  emerged after the 12th century when the popularity of the Chinese melodies in Japan called  waned.

Description 
Although a double reed instrument like the oboe, the  has a cylindrical bore and thus its sound is similar to that of a clarinet. It is difficult to play due in part to the double reed configuration. It is made of a piece of bamboo that measures  with a flat double reed inserted which makes a loud sound.

Pitch and ornamentation (most notably bending tones) are controlled largely with the embouchure.

This is evident in the notations of the finger positioning, a tablature of signs derived from Chinese characters.

Notable Japanese musicians who play the  include Hideki Togi and Hitomi Nakamura.

Non-Japanese musicians who have learned to play the  include Alan Hovhaness, Richard Teitelbaum, Thomas Piercy and Joseph Celli.

References

External links
- Traditional Japanese Music

Gagaku
Japanese musical instruments
Single oboes with cylindrical bore
Kagura
Sacred musical instruments
Japanese words and phrases